Tørrissen is a Norwegian surname. Notable people with the surname include:

Berger Torrissen (1901–1991), Norwegian-born American skier 
Erik Tørrissen (born 1988), Norwegian yachtsman and politician 
Johannes Tørrissen Worum (1817–1889), Norwegian politician

Norwegian-language surnames